may refer to:

Real Onigokko, a 2001 Japanese horror novel by Yusuke Yamada
 Real Onigokko, a 2008 film adaptation of the novel
 "Real Onigokko" (song), theme song of the 2008 film performed by Kotoko
 Tag (film) (Real Onigokko in Japanese), a 2015 film adaptation of the novel
 "Real Onigokko", theme song of the 2015 film performed by Glim Spanky

See also
 For the Japanese game of Onigokko, see tag (game).